Siger is the leading holding company of Mohammed VI, the king of Morocco.

The company evolved out of a holding of the same name that belonged to Hassan II but was renamed to Ergis (now belonging to the Heirs of Hassan II), whereas Siger was founded as a new entity in 2002, and entirely belonging to Mohammed VI. 
It has participations in Société Nationale d'Investissement and Morocco's leading agribusiness firm Les Domaines Agricoles.

The company is managed by Mounir Majidi, the personal secretary of the Alaouite monarch. Former CEOs included Hassan Bouhemou and Driss Jettou.

Subsidiaries
Société Nationale d'Investissement (SNI)
Les Domaines Agricoles
Primarios (construction firm)

References

Holding companies of Morocco
Mohammed VI of Morocco
2002 establishments in Morocco
Holding companies established in 2002